Brooke Kerith Satchwell (born 1980) is an Australian actress, model and environmental spokesperson.

Early life
Satchwell lived in Teesdale, Victoria, for most of her life and has one sibling. She attended Toorak College.

Career
Satchwell started acting in 1994 when a casting agent suggested she model in a few television advertisements. She also appeared in the Australian Broadcasting Corporation musical Harriet. After she had completed work on an advertisement for Just Jeans, a make-up artist advised Satchwell to get an agent. A year later she successfully auditioned for the role of Anne Wilkinson in the daily television soap opera Neighbours, which she played for five years.

Satchwell modelled for Pantene and was signed to act as their 'brand ambassador' in 2004.

Satchwell got her first lead role on a film in 2008 in Subdivision which was released in cinemas on 20 August 2009. In 2012, Satchwell joined the cast of drama series Packed to the Rafters as Frankie, an electrician and employee of Dave Rafter. In 2013, she became a regular panellist on celebrity gossip, comedy show Dirty Laundry Live. That same year, Satchwell joined the cast of Wonderland as lawyer Grace Barnes. After three seasons, Wonderland was cancelled due to falling ratings. Satchwell has appeared in some episodes of children's television show Play School.

In 2014, Satchwell made a guest appearance on sketch comedy series Black Comedy, as Tiffany. She reprised the character in the second series in 2016. She also appeared in the Jack Irish series. 2018 saw Satchwell make guest appearances on Hughesy, We Have a Problem, and the SBS drama Dead Lucky. She also plays Ally, the girlfriend of hit-man Ray Shoesmith, in the black comedy-drama Mr Inbetween. Towards the end of the year, Satchwell replaced Jane Harber as team captain for the second season of comedy panel show Show Me the Movie!.

Satchwell plays park ranger Miranda Gibson, the estranged daughter of Laura Gibson (Sigrid Thornton), in the revival series of SeaChange. Satchwell admitted that she almost missed the casting call, as she was moving house. The actress flew between Sydney and Byron, Mullumbimby and Brunswick Heads to film SeaChange and the second season of Mr Inbetween.

Personal life
Satchwell has promoted charity work as a fundraiser for the Starlight Children's Foundation Gift of a Lifetime, and in joining the fight against sand mining of Sydney's historic Kurnell sand dunes.  In 2009, Satchwell supported Power Shift, a climate-change conference for young people held in Sydney.

Satchwell's five-year relationship with actor Matthew Newton ended in 2006. Newton was charged with four offences including common assault, intimidation and assault occasioning actual bodily harm against Satchwell. Three of the charges were withdrawn by prosecutors, Newton pleading guilty on the remaining charge of common assault. 

On 26 November 2008, Satchwell was in a building which was attacked by terrorists in the Mumbai Terrorist Attacks. She hid in a cupboard until gunfire ceased. One gunman passed by the cupboard as she sat hidden from view. Upon leaving the hotel, she said she had seen several dead bodies.

Satchwell was engaged to film editor David Gross from 2012 until 2019. In 2015, she stated that long times separated by distance made it hard for them to ever set a date for the wedding.

Filmography

Television

Film

Theatre

References

External links 

 

Living people
1980 births
20th-century Australian actresses
21st-century Australian actresses
Australian children's television presenters
Australian female models
Australian soap opera actresses
Australian stage actresses
Logie Award winners
Australian women television presenters
Survivors of the 2008 Mumbai attacks